LeBourgeois or Lebourgeois is a surname. Notable people with the surname include:

Julien J. LeBourgeois (1923–2012), American admiral
Yvan Lebourgeois (born 1962), French footballer

See also
Anita Calvert Lebourgeoise (1879–1940), American attorney, judge, genealogist, biographer, and women's suffrage orator